The Daqin Pagoda is a Buddhist pagoda in Zhouzhi County of Xi'an (formerly Chang'an), Shaanxi Province, China, located about two kilometres to the west of Louguantai temple. The pagoda has been claimed as a Church of the East from the Tang Dynasty.

Etymology
Daqin is the ancient Chinese name for the Roman Empire or, depending on context, the Near East, especially Syria.

History
The Daqin Pagoda is first attested in 1065, when the Chinese poet Wassabi visited it and wrote a well-known poem about it, "Daqin Temple". His younger brother Su Zhe also wrote an "echoing" poem referring to the monks at the temple. An earthquake severely damaged the pagoda in 1556 and it was finally abandoned. Due to the earthquake, many of the underground chambers of the complex are no longer reachable.

Features
The seven-storeyed octagonal brick pagoda is about 34 meters high(was thought to be 32 in the past). Each side of the first storey measures 4.3 meters.

Speculation about Christianity
The Daqin Pagoda was visited by Assyrian Church of the East Bishop Mar Awa Royel in 2012 as part of a follow-up visit to China in 2010, upon invitation from the Jingjiao Fellowship and director Mr. David Tam.

In 2001 the pagoda was claimed by Martin Palmer, the translator of several popular books on Sinology, including Zhuangzi and I Ching, as a form of Christianity from the Tang Dynasty, in his controversial book The Jesus Sutras. According to Palmer, the church and the monastery were built in 640 by early Church of the East missionaries. Daqin is the name for the Roman Empire in the early Chinese language documents of the 1st and 2nd centuries,
by the mid-9th century it was also used to refer to the mission churches of the Syriac Christians.

Supporters of Palmer's claims have drawn attention to details which suggest that the monastery was earlier a Christian church, including a supposed depiction of Jonah at the walls of Nineveh, a nativity scene (depiction of the birth of Jesus) and Syriac graffiti.  The east-facing orientation of the complex is also advanced as evidence of its Christian origin since Chinese Daoist and Buddhist temple complexes face north or south.

As a potential stimulus to the district's tourist trade, Palmer's claims have been given wide publicity by the local authorities but have also received approbation by Chinese academics.  The exterior of the pagoda and its surroundings were featured in the first episode of the 2009 BBC program A History of Christianity. The program also featured an interview with Palmer by the presenter Professor Diarmaid MacCulloch.

Despite the publicity they have received, Palmer's claims are controversial, and have been dismissed by Michael Keevak, the author of The Story of a Stele, and by David Wilmshurst, the author of The Martyred Church: A History of the Church of the East.

James Morris of the University of St. Andrews has stated of the pagoda that "until more detailed archaeological analysis of the site is undertaken [...] we must be content in maintaining that there are no proven direct archaeological remains for the presence of Christianity during the Táng period."

See also

Xi'an Stele
Church of the East in China
Jingjiao Documents
Daqin

References

Citations

Sources 

 Keevak, Michael, The Story of a Stele: China's Nestorian Monument and Its Reception in the West, 1625-1916 (Hong Kong, 2008).
 Palmer, Martin, The Jesus Sutras: Discovering the Lost Scrolls of Taoist Christianity (New York, 2001).
 Wilmshurst, David, The Martyred Church: A History of the Church of the East (London, 2011).

External links
 Did Christianity Reach China In the First Century?
Orthodox article on site

Churches in Xi'an
Pagodas in China
Church of the East in China
7th-century churches
Tang dynasty architecture
Major National Historical and Cultural Sites in Shaanxi